Mordecai Waxman, KCSG (February 25, 1917, in Albany – August 10, 2002, in Great Neck, New York), was a prominent rabbi in the Conservative Jewish movement for nearly 60 years.  He served as rabbi of Temple Israel in Great Neck, New York for 55 years from 1947 through his death in 2002.  He is most notable for his interactions with Pope John Paul II in the 1980s as chairman of the International Jewish Committee for Interreligious Consultations.

Waxman was the author of Tradition and Change: The Development of Conservative Judaism, published in 1958.  He also served as editor of  the journal, Conservative Judaism for five years, from 1969 to 1974.

Waxman received his bachelor's degree at the University of Chicago and was ordained at the Jewish Theological Seminary of America in New York City.  He was an Army chaplain during World War II, serving in Fort Dix, New Jersey and served from 1941 to 1942 as rabbi of Temple Beth Israel (Niagara Falls, New York), and also in Chicago, Illinois.

1987 Papal Address
The following is an excerpt from Waxman's speech delivered in September 1987 to Pope John Paul II:

Catholics and Jews have begun the long overdue process of reconciliation. We still have some way to go because Catholic-Jewish relations is one of this century's most positive developments.

We remain concerned with the persistence of anti-Semitism - the hatred of Jews and Judaism, which is on the rise in some parts of the world. We are encouraged by your vigorous leadership in denouncing all forms of anti-Semitism, and by the church's recent teachings. The church's repudiation of anti-Semitism is of critical importance in the struggle to eradicate this virulent plague from the entire human family.

Anti-Semitism may affect the body of the Jew, but history has tragically shown that it assaults the soul of the Christian world and all others who succumb to this ancient, but persistent pathology.

We hope that your strong condemnations of anti-Semitism will continue to be implemented in the schools, the parishes, teaching materials and the liturgy, and reflected in the attitudes and behavior of Catholics throughout the world. Greater attention needs to be paid to the Christian roots of anti-Semitism. The teaching of contempt reaped a demonic harvest during the Shoah in which one-third of the Jewish people were murdered as a central component of a nation's policy. The Nazi Holocaust-Shoah brought together two very different forms of evil: On the one hand it represented the triumph of an ideology of nationalism and racism, the suppression of human conscience and the deification of the state - concepts that are profoundly anti-Christian as well as anti-Jewish. On the other hand the Shoah was the culmination of centuries of anti-Semitism in European culture for which Christian teachings bear a heavy responsibility.

Personal
 Waxman's wife, Ruth, died in 1996. She taught literature at the University of Chicago, Adelphi University, Long Island University C.W. Post Campus, Stony Brook University and Queens College.  She was editor of Judaism: A Quarterly Journal of Jewish Life and Thought, published by the American Jewish Congress.
 In 1998, Waxman was named a Knight Commander of the Order of St. Gregory the Great by Pope John Paul II. He was the first rabbi and the fifth Jew to receive the honor.
 Waxman died just weeks before he was scheduled to retire on September 1, 2002.
 In the 1960s, Rabbi Harold Kushner, the best-selling author of When Bad Things Happen to Good People, worked as an assistant under Rabbi Waxman at Temple Israel in Great Neck, New York.
 Waxman is survived by three children, Rabbi Jonathan Waxman, David Waxman, and Hillel Waxman, and 5 grandchildren, Ariya Waxman, Amir-Kia Waxman, Lailee Waxman, Jessye Waxman, and Avir Waxman

References

 GOLDMAN ARI L. "Mordecai Waxman, Rabbi Who Chided Pope, Dies at 85." New York Times, August 15, 2002
 Ain, Stewart. "'Rabbi Of Rabbis' Dies: Mordecai Waxman served the same Long Island pulpit for 55 years, but his influence was felt by the world." The Jewish Week, August 16, 2002.
Frank, Carol. "A Great Man Has Passed." Great Neck Record, August 23, 2002
"Those Who Attended Talks." New York Times, September 2, 1987
Temple Israel of Great Neck History
Rabbi Mordecai Waxman - An Appreciation.  An essay by Arthur Rosenbloom.
Passing of Interfaith Pioneer, Rabbi Mordecai Waxman (Center For Christian-Jewish Understanding)

External links
Temple Israel of Great Neck (official website)
Waxman High School at Temple Israel of Great Neck

American Conservative rabbis
20th-century American rabbis
University of Chicago alumni
Jewish Theological Seminary of America semikhah recipients
People from Great Neck, New York
Knights of St. Gregory the Great
United States Army personnel of World War II
United States Army officers
1917 births
2002 deaths
United States Army chaplains
World War II chaplains
Rabbis in the military